Kury or KURY may refer to:

People
Adam Kury (born 1969), American bassist and vocalist
Franklin Kury (born 1936), American politician based in Pennsylvania 
Julyana Kury (born 1983), a Brazilian swimmer
Michael Kury (born 1978), Austrian ski jumper

Other uses
Kury, Masovian Voivodeship, a village in Poland
Kury (band), a Polish rock group
KURY (AM), a radio station (910 AM) licensed to Brookings, Oregon, U.S.
KURY-FM, a radio station (95.3 FM) licensed to Brookings, Oregon, U.S.

See also

Kuri (disambiguation)
Khouri, or Khoury, a surname